Frederick Thomas Vaughn (October 18, 1918 – March 2, 1964), nicknamed "Muscles",  was a professional baseball player.  He was a second baseman over parts of two seasons (1944–45) with the Washington Senators.  For his career, he compiled a .241 batting average in 377 at-bats, with two home runs and 46 runs batted in.

He was born in Coalinga, California and died in an auto accident in Lake Wales, Florida at the age of 45.

External links

1918 births
1964 deaths
Baseball players from California
Binghamton Triplets players
Birmingham Barons players
Bismarck Barons players
Greensboro Patriots players
Hollywood Stars players
Hutchinson Larks players
Indianapolis Indians players
Major League Baseball second basemen
Minneapolis Millers (baseball) players
Minor league baseball managers
Nashville Vols players
New Orleans Pelicans (baseball) players
People from Coalinga, California
Portland Beavers players
Road incident deaths in Florida
Washington Senators (1901–1960) players
Williston Oilers players